Christina Axelsson (born 1949) is a Swedish social democratic politician who has been a member of the Riksdag since 2002, she was substitute in the Riksdag from 1995 to 2002.

External links
Christina Axelsson at the Riksdag website

21st-century Swedish women politicians
1949 births
Living people
Politicians from Stockholm
Members of the Riksdag from the Social Democrats
Members of the Riksdag 2002–2006
Women members of the Riksdag